Sir Richard Butler (3 December 1850 – 28 April 1925) was an Australian politician. He was a member of the South Australian House of Assembly from 1890 to 1924, representing Yatala (1890–1902) and Barossa (1902–1924). He served as Premier of South Australia from March to July 1905 and Leader of the Opposition from 1905 to 1909. Butler would also variously serve as Speaker of the House of Assembly (1921–1924), and as a minister under Premiers Charles Kingston, John Jenkins and Archibald Peake. His son, Richard Layton Butler, went on to serve as Premier from 1927 to 1930 and 1933 to 1938.

Early life
Richard Butler was born at Stadhampton, near Oxford, England, elder son of Richard Butler, père and his wife Mary Eliza, née Sadler. They emigrated with their two children Mary and Richard to South Australia, arriving in Adelaide on 8 March 1854, following Richard pères brother Philip, who emigrated fourteen years earlier, made a fortune as a pastoralist and landowner, established Mallala sheep station, and built a two-storey homestead on his property Yattalunga station (also spelled "Yatalunga"), near Gawler, then returned to England in December 1857. Richard père took over management of "Mallala" and "Yattalunga", where the growing family (see below) lived until around 1870.

Young Richard was educated at St Peter's College, Adelaide, then spent many years as a farmer and grazier. He was a Justice of the Peace before he was 30.

Political career
Butler attempted to enter parliament early in 1890 when he stood for Yatala but was defeated. A few months later he won the seat at a by-election caused by the death of James Cowan. On 13 April 1898 he succeeded Cockburn as minister of agriculture in the Kingston ministry which resigned in December 1899. Yatala was abolished in 1902 and Butler represented Barossa from 3 May 1902 to 4 April 1924.

Butler became the parliamentary leader of an informal group of country members supported by the Farmers and Producers Political Union in 1904. Butler was treasaurer in the Jenkins ministry from 15 May 1901 to 1 March 1905, and was also Commissioner of Crown Lands and Immigration from 1 April 1902 to 1 March 1905. Jenkins then went to London as agent-general.  Butler succeeded him as Premier, still keeping his previous portfolios. His ministry was defeated soon after the 1905 election where Labor formed government under Thomas Price and retained government at the 1906 election, relegating Butler to opposition until a year before the 1910 election, when Labor lost government resulting from Price's death. The Liberal and Democratic Union (LDU) insisted on taking the premiership. On 22 December 1909 Butler joined the first Peake LDU ministry as Treasurer and Minister for the Northern Territory, but the ministry was defeated following the 1910 election. Following the 1912 election, Butler was Commissioner of Public Works in the second Peake ministry from 17 February 1912 to 10 November 1914 and Minister of Mines and of Marine from 17 February 1912 to 3 April 1915. The Peake government was defeated at the 1915 election, however Labor split over conscription in 1917 which brought down the government. Butler was Treasurer once again and Minister of Railways in Peake's third ministry from 14 July 1917 to 7 May 1919, and Minister of Agriculture 19 December 1918 to 7 May 1919.

Butler left the ministry in controversial circumstances. The report of the Royal Commission on the Wheat Scheme appeared to reflect on the actions of Butler while he was the minister in charge of it, and Peake asked Butler to resign. He refused to do so because he considered that that would admit the justice of the charges. The Executive Council, on the advice of the government, thereupon dismissed Butler from his offices. The report of another royal commission presented some 14 months later was, however, accepted as clearing him of guilt; also the fact that he was elected Speaker of the South Australian House of Assembly in 1921 suggests there had been injustice. Butler was defeated in his seat at the 1924 election after having represented the same district area for 34 years.

Late life
At the beginning of 1925 Butler went on a trip to England and died at South Croydon on 28 April 1925. Butler was made a knight bachelor in 1913. He had married Helena Kate Layton in 1878 and Ethel Pauline Finer in 1894, who survived him.  He had eight children by his first marriage and three by his second.

Butler's son, Richard Layton Butler, was twice premier of South Australia (1927–30 and 1933–38). His great-grandson Mark Butler is a Labor member of the Australian House of Representatives.

Family

Richard Butler
Richard Butler  (c. 1812 – 9 June 1887) married Mary Eliza Sadler (c. 1822 – 18 June 1898), arrived in South Australia March 1854
Mary Butler (c. 1849 – 13 August 1899) married Rev. John Garlick Pitcher (1842 – 27 September 1900)  on 16 August 1877. He previously married Elizabeth Charlotte Catherine Smyth-Blood (c. 1849 – 20 July 1870) on 7 November 1867. Their family included:
John Blood Pitcher (1870–1949) accountant, auditor for Thebarton Town Council
Richard Charles Pitcher (1878 – 18 May 1919) actor, elocutionist, headmaster in South Africa.
Margaret Mary Pitcher (1880– )
Alice Catherine Pitcher (1884– )
Cyril Frederick Pitcher MD (1887–1955)
May Eleanor Gertrude Pitcher (1889– )
Ronald Oswine (later Oswin) Pitcher (1892–1971) chairman of Municipal Tramways Trust 1944–
Sir Richard Butler (3 December 1850 – 28 April 1925) married Helena Kate Layton ( – 17 April 1893) on 2 January 1878; they had eight children; he married again to Ethel Pauline Finey (1864 – 16 July 1952) on 7 June 1894; they had three more children.

Col. Charles Philip Butler (16 July 1880 – 25 September 1953)  agricultural editor for The Advertiser
Helen Margaret Butler (16 May 1882 – ) married Rev John Stoward Moyes in 1909. He became Archdeacon of Adelaide and Bishop of Armidale
Helena Margaret Moyes (1910– )
Guy Stoward Moyes (1915–2004)
Peter Morton Moyes (1917– )
Philip Richard Moyes (1918– )
Monica Mary Moyes (1924– )
second daughter Mary Acres Butler ( – 13 June 1974) married Rev. Herbert Ramsden Cavalier (1877–1965) on 13 January 1915
Sir Richard Layton Butler (31 March 1885 – 21 January 1966) married Maude Isabel Draper (23 July 1883 – ) on 4 January 1908
Mary Helen "Mollie" Butler (1908–1993) married Capt. John Neil McEwin (14 July 1907 – 1993) on 19 August 1931. Capt. McEwin was a great-grandson of George McEwin (1815–1885).
Jean Kate Butler (20 September 1909 – ) married Ian Eversley Thomas (1902–1970) in 1937
Richard Charles Layton Butler (30 March 1917 – 1987) married Patricia Marie Tardrew (1920–1998) on 5 June 1944
Guy Theodore Butler (7 February 1888 – 23 July 1948) married Gladys Seymour Keay ( – 26 January 1941) on 11 January 1917
third daughter Dorothy Kate "Dolly" Butler (27 July 1889 – 1964) married lawyer Charles Mortimer Muirhead (1857 – 23 September 1938) on c. 1 May 1913. He was the father of Henry Mortimer Muirhead (see below)
Kathleen Sarah Agnes "Kate" Butler (28 October 1891 – 1968) married Henry Mortimer Muirhead (31 July 1885 – 2 September 1951) on 29 December 1923

Ruth Ethel Muriel Butler (20 January 1897 – c. September 1976 in Terrigal, NSW) married Lieut. Cyril William Goodman (30 December 1893 – 1978) on 28 April 1917. He was a son of Sir William Goodman (1872–1961), managing director and chief engineer of the Municipal Tramways Trust. 
Kate Lisette "Katie" Butler (1855 – 17 July 1929) married Frederick Taylor Whitington (13 June 1853 – 30 November 1938) on 1 October 1878
(Jane) Agnes Butler (1857 – 17 January 1943) was a nurse, lived at 58 Anglesea Street, Hobart
Helen Margaret "Nellie" Butler (1860 – 23 September 1949) lived with her widowed mother at Brighton, died at home of nephew Cyril Pitcher, 59 Dutton Terrace, Medindie.
Henry Herbert "Harry" Butler (1861 – 8 February 1939) married Lillie Muriel Rudall (1866 – 14 July 1954) on 7 April 1885. He was town clerk of Strathalbyn; contested seat of Murray 1920
Daniel Frederick "Dan" Butler (1864 – 25 August 1928) married Susan Maude/Maud Angus ( – 1949) in 1904

Philip Butler
Richard's brother Philip Butler (c. 1822–1899) arrived on vessel John in February 1840 and was associated with A. W. Thorold Grant. in running sheep on a large property in the Hundred of Munno Para and at Mudla Wirra; leased "Mallala" inc. Gawler; married Matilda Roe on 13 September 1849. He built a large two-storey house on his property "Yattalunga" (frequently "Yatalunga"), later occupied by his brother Richard. Philip and his family returned to England, where Matilda died on 12 April 1862. He married again to Margaret Chesshyre on 2 July 1863, returned to South Australia briefly then retired to England. Their children were: 
Matilda Mary Butler (born 30 July 1850; died young)
Edith Lucille Butler (8 March 1852 – ) married Prof. Charles Henry Pearson on 10 December 1872.
Alice Isabel Butler (23 December 1853 – )
Millicent Lecette Butler (10 August 1855 – )
Charles Philip Roe Butler (15 April 1857 – )
He had three further children in England: a son on 15 February 1859 and twins in November 1862.

See also
Hundred of Butler

Notes and references

References
Kay Rollison, 'Butler, Sir Richard (1850–1925)', Australian Dictionary of Biography, Volume 7, MUP, 1979, pp 505–506.
List of Prime Minister/Premier by date at Australian Government and Politics Database Project

Parliament of South Australia, Statistical Record of the Legislature 1836 – 2007; Compiled in the Offices of the Clerk of the Parliaments and the Clerk of the Legislative Council, page 61, Retrieved 17 September 2012
 

|-

|-

|-

|-

|-

|-

1850 births
1925 deaths
Premiers of South Australia
Australian Knights Bachelor
Australian politicians awarded knighthoods
People educated at St Peter's College, Adelaide
Speakers of the South Australian House of Assembly
Leaders of the Opposition in South Australia
Treasurers of South Australia
English emigrants to colonial Australia
South Australian families